= Reid Byers =

Reid Byers is an American author and bibliophile.

== Books ==
- The Private Library: The History of the Architecture and Furnishing of the Domestic Bookroom (2021) The Private Library was listed among the best non-fiction books of the year by the Washington Post.
- Imaginary Books: Lost, Unfinished, and Fictive Works Found Only in Other Books (2024) Imaginary Books won the 2026 Leab Award for excellence in description in a print catalog from the American Library Association.
